The Capitol Hill Library is a branch of the Multnomah County Library, in the West Portland Park neighborhood of Portland in the U.S. state of Oregon. The branch offers the Multnomah County Library catalog of two million books, periodicals and other materials. Capitol Hill and the Holgate branch are of a similar design.

History
Until the 1960s, Portland's system of public libraries relied heavily on the downtown Central Library supplemented by small collections at many locations in outlying neighborhoods . As population densities changed, the library board responded by establishing larger collections in fewer locations and creating new branch libraries. From 1967 through 1969, the board worked to establish a new branch near Capitol Hill in the West Portland Park neighborhood. The architectural plan was the same as that of the Holgate Library.

Although the library opened part-time for a month in early 1972, it did not open officially until December 5, 1972, aided by federal revenue sharing funds. Budget crises affected the library through the 1970s and early 1980s, and Capitol Hill sometimes operated on reduced hours and book budgets through 1984. In that year, voters approved a three-year serial levy (tax) to help fund the library system. Subsequent temporary levies supported the system through November 2012, when voters approved a permanent levy.

In 1996, Multnomah County voters passed a bond measure to renovate some branches and to upgrade technology across the system. Closed for renovation in mid-1998, Capitol Hill reopened on February 16, 1999. The architect on the original building was Allen, McMath and Hawkins, and the renovation architect was Thomas Hacker and Associates.

See also

 List of Carnegie libraries in Oregon

References

1972 establishments in Oregon
Libraries in Portland, Oregon
Library buildings completed in 1972
Multnomah County Library
Libraries established in 1972
Southwest Portland, Oregon